German pop singer Sasha has released nine studio albums, one compilation album, and 17 singles. Originally a backing vocalist, Sasha started his career as the chorus voice for virtual eurodance projects and rap acts such as Sir Prize and Der Wolf. Following a successful feature with rapper Young Deenay, he release his debut album Dedicated to... on Warner Music in fall 1998. The album became a major success around Europe, selling more than 400,000 copies in Germany alone, and produced four singles, including "If You Believe", which would become his highest-charting single to date, receiving one platinum and four gold discs. His second album, ...you (2000), was less successful on most international territories but manifested his success throughout German-speaking Europe and was certified double gold by the IFPI. Sasha's third studio album, Surfin' on a Backbeat, was released in 2003 and spawned four singles, including 2002 FIFA World Cup hymn "This Is My Time". 

By 2003, Sasha started performing as his alter ego Dick Brave, the lead singer of a rockabilly band called Dick Brave & The Backbeats. Originally conceived as a humorous lark, the quintet released an album called Dick This! (2003) together, which eventually became the singer's first number-one record, and produced a remake of 1961's "Take Good Care of My Baby" as a single. Following the project's discontinuation and a two years-hiatus, Sasha released Open Water in 2006. The album became his lowest-selling effort to date, and produced two moderately successful singles only. His first Greatest Hits compilation was released in late 2006.

Albums

Studio albums

As Dick Brave

Compilation albums

Singles

As lead artist

As featured artist

Miscellaneous

Appearances

DVDs

References

External links
 Sasha.de — official site

Discographies of German artists
Pop music discographies